The 1997 British Speedway Championship was the 37th edition of the British Speedway Championship. The Final took place on 1 June at Brandon in Coventry, England. The Championship was won by Mark Loram, who won took the title after winning a run-off with rival Chris Louis. Sean Wilson finished third, taking the final place on the podium.

Final 
1 June 1997
 Brandon Stadium, Coventry

{| width=100%
|width=50% valign=top|

See also 
 British Speedway Championship

References 

British Speedway Championship
Great Britain